Charles "Chad" Kanoff  (born October 6, 1994) is a former American football quarterback. He played college football at Princeton. He signed as an undrafted free agent with the Arizona Cardinals in 2018.

College career
After missing the 2014 season due to a shoulder injury, Kanoff started his first game in a spring exhibition in Japan vs the Kwansei Gakuin Fighters in 2015 where the Tigers won 36-7. Kanoff was named the Legacy Bowl MVP. In the 2015 season he started all 10 games, and became the first Princeton quarterback since Chad Roghair (1991) to win his first four collegiate starts. In the 2016 season, Kanoff earned second-team All-Ivy League honors as the starting quarterback and tri-captain after leading Princeton to the Ivy League championship. In the 2017 season, Kanoff became Princeton's 11th Bushnell Cup winner as the Ivy League Offensive Player of the Year after a record-breaking season. He broke the Ivy League record for single-season passing yards with 3,474, and single-season completion percentage with 73.2% (previous mark was 70.4%), and was 2nd all-time for touchdowns in a season with 29. Handed Harvard its worst home Ivy loss in 50 years (52-17) by going 31 for 35 for 421 yards and two touchdowns. Kanoff also broke the Princeton career record for passing yards with 7,510.

Professional career

Arizona Cardinals
After going undrafted in the 2018 NFL Draft, Kanoff signed as an undrafted free agent with the Arizona Cardinals on May 1, 2018. He was waived on September 1, 2018 and was signed to the practice squad the next day. He was promoted to the active roster on November 24, 2018. He was waived on November 29, 2018 and re-signed to the practice squad. He signed a reserve/future contract with the Cardinals on December 31, 2018.

On August 31, 2019, Kanoff was waived by the Cardinals during final roster cuts.

Detroit Lions
On September 4, 2019, Kanoff was signed to the Detroit Lions practice squad. He was released on September 11.

Tampa Bay Buccaneers
On October 9, 2019, Kanoff was signed to the Tampa Bay Buccaneers practice squad. His practice squad contract with the team expired on January 6, 2020.

New York Guardians
Kanoff signed with the New York Guardians of the XFL on January 5, 2020.

Los Angeles Wildcats
Kanoff was traded to the Los Angeles Wildcats in exchange for Luis Perez on January 19, 2020.
Kanoff scored the first touchdown in Los Angeles Wildcats (XFL) franchise history with a scramble left for a five yard score. He had his contract terminated when the league suspended operations on April 10, 2020.

Career statistics

References

1994 births
Living people
American football quarterbacks
Arizona Cardinals players
Detroit Lions players
Los Angeles Wildcats (XFL) players
New York Guardians players
People from Pacific Palisades, California
Players of American football from Los Angeles
Princeton Tigers football players
Tampa Bay Buccaneers players